The Cypress Hills are a geographical region of hills in southwestern Saskatchewan and southeastern Alberta, Canada. The hills are part of the Missouri Coteau upland.

Name

The Cypress Hills have been known by a wide number of Indigenous and European names throughout their history. An 1882 Blackfoot–English dictionary written by C. M. Lanning provided the Blackfoot language name , which translates as "striped earth" or "earth over earth". The Gros Ventre language name is  "pine trees". Early Métis hunters, who spoke Métis French, called the hills , in reference to the abundance of Lodgepole Pine trees. In the Canadian French spoken by the Métis, the pine is called , although it is not a true cypress tree. The English translation is Cypress Hills.

Geology and geomorphology
They are the remnant of a more widespread plateau, most of which has been removed by erosion. The plateau is capped by the resistant conglomerate and sandstone beds of the Cypress Hills Formation. That formation was deposited by rivers that flowed from the mountains of southwestern Alberta and northwestern Montana during late Eocene to middle Miocene time, and is known for its wealth of vertebrate fossils.

During the Pleistocene, the top of the Cypress Hills was not overridden by the Laurentide Ice Sheet and remained unglaciated. As the ice sheet paused periodically during its final retreat, a series of morainal ridges of glacial till built up around the hills. Rivers of meltwater cut large channels through the area as the retreat continued, and smaller streams carved coulees and areas of badlands.

Today the Cypress Hills are part of a major drainage divide that separates rivers that drain south to the Gulf of Mexico via the Missouri River system from those that drain to northeast to Hudson Bay via the Nelson River system. At the Dividing Springs Ranch northwest of Eastend, Saskatchewan, the water from a spring goes both south to Gulf of Mexico and northeast to Hudson Bay.

Ecology

Due to their higher elevation, the upper slopes and summit of the Cypress Hills experience cooler temperatures and greater rainfall than the surrounding semi-arid plains, and they support a flora and fauna that is much like that of the mountains south of the Canada–United States border in Montana and Wyoming.

Flora
The north-facing slopes and some of the valleys host forests of aspen, lodgepole pine, and white spruce. The remainder of the area is covered by mixed grass prairie, with fescue prairie in higher areas. Wildflowers include prairie crocus, three-flowered avens, lupine, blue bells, and prairie rose. There are fourteen species of orchids, including the Venus's slipper orchid and the striped coralroot orchid, which are found primarily in wooded areas and along the banks of springs and streams.

Fauna
Small mammals of the area include a wide variety of rodents, as well as shrews, bats, jackrabbits, skunks, mink, weasels, foxes, bobcats, Canada lynx, and others. Large mammals include moose, elk, mule deer, white-tailed deer, pronghorn, coyotes, cougars, and more. There are several species of snakes, including the prairie rattlesnake, as well as lizards and turtles. The many species of birds range from mountain bluebird and greater sage-grouse to the great horned owl and other birds of prey. Fish in Elkwater Lake and other lakes and streams in the area include walleye, yellow perch, northern pike, several species of trout, and others.

History

Historically the Cypress Hills were a meeting and conflict area for various Native Americans and Indigenous Canadians (First Nations) including the Cree, Assiniboine, Atsina, Blackfoot Confederacy, Saulteaux, Sioux, Crow, and others. During the 19th century Métis settled in the hills, hunting and often wintering there. The Cypress Hills Massacre, a key event in Canadian history leading to the creation of the North-West Mounted Police, occurred in the hills when a group of American wolf hunters, known as wolfers, from Montana massacred an Assiniboine encampment. Fort Walsh was established to bring law and order to the Canada–United States border region.

Interprovincial park 

Cypress Hills Provincial Park – one of the six original provincial parks of Saskatchewan – was established in 1931. In 1951, it was extended into neighbouring Alberta. Cypress Hills Interprovincial Park was created in 1989, which joined the two parks on either side of the provincial border.

The Saskatchewan side of the park is divided into two blocks: Centre Block, which has fully developed year round tourist facilities, and West Block Wilderness area, with rustic camping and the location of Fort Walsh National Historic Site.

The Alberta portion of the Cypress Hills contains the tourist destination of Elkwater, a community with campground facilities located on the southern shore of Elkwater Lake. The townsite is mainly made up of summer cabins.

Climate
Cypress Hills has a subarctic climate (Dfc) bordering on a humid continental climate (Dfb) due to its elevation above the surrounding area. Summer days are mild to warm coupled with cool nights, while winters are cold and snowy with annual snowfall averaging . It is also considerably more moist than the surrounding prairies. Precipitation peaks during the month of June, where thunderstorms are common.

In popular culture
The Cypress Hills region is featured in Saskatchewan-based country singer Colter Wall's 2022 single "Cypress Hills and the Big Country".

See also
List of highest points of Canadian provinces and territories
Geography of Saskatchewan
Geography of Alberta

References

External links
Encyclopedia of Saskatchewan

Cypress County
Hills of Alberta
Hills of Saskatchewan
Maple Creek No. 111, Saskatchewan
Natural history of Alberta
Natural history of Saskatchewan
Drainage divides
Landforms of Saskatchewan